The 2022 World Armwrestling Championship was the 43rd edition of the World Armwrestling Championship held in Antalya, Turkey from 14 to 23 October.

Medal summary

Medal table

Medalists

Men

Left arm

Right arm

Women

Left arm

Right arm

References 

2022
International sports competitions hosted by Turkey
2022 in Turkish sport
Sports competitions in Antalya
October 2022 sports events in Europe
October 2022 sports events in Asia
https://m.youtube.com/watch?v=GJ54E2dxOJs